Hippobromus pauciflorus (Afrikaans: Baster-perdepis = False horse urine), commonly known as false horsewood, is a small South African semi-deciduous tree occurring on the margins of forest, stream banks and in scrub forest. Frequently growing as a tall, slender sapling and accordingly prized as wattle for hut-building. Leaves 75 mm to 150 mm long, paripinnate with some 5 pairs of leaflets which are extremely variable in shape, wedge-shaped at the base, entire, dentate or deeply lobed, sessile and winged on the rachis between leaflets. Panicles up to 75 mm long and many-flowered. Fruits are about 8 mm in diameter, black, pulpy and unpalatable. All parts of the tree have an unpleasant odour when bruised. Fourcade describes the wood as "very heavy and hard, very strong, moderately elastic, close-grained ... heartwood brown, sapwood white, tinged with brown, used for wagon-work and other purposes. The wood and leaves contain a strongly scented resinous and oily substance, which renders them readily inflammable." This tree is found along the east coast from the Eastern Cape, through KwaZulu Natal, Eswatini and further inland through the Transvaal up to the Soutpansberg.

It is one of the few trees on which the larva of the Swallow-tail butterfly (Papilio demoleus) will feed other than species of citrus belonging to Rutaceae. The name 'Hippobromus' is Greek for 'smelling of horse urine', which it closely resembles. The specific name is Latin for 'few-flowered'. It belongs to the family Sapindaceae, closely related to Rutaceae, together with over 100 other genera such as Sapindus, Litchi, Koelreuteria, Dodonaea and Blighia.

References
The Forests and Forest Flora of the Colony of the Cape of Good Hope by Thomas Robertson Sim (1907)

External links

Sapindaceae